The Archeda is a river in Volgograd Oblast, Russia. The Archeda begins in the southwestern part of the Volga Uplands. Most of its water are from melting snow, and during periods of low water the river dries up entirely in its upper and middle flow. The town of Frolovo lies along the Archeda.

References

Rivers of Volgograd Oblast